Baccharis alaternoides is a shrub of the family Asteraceae found in the Andes with a distribution from Ecuador to Peru.

References

alaternoides
Flora of Ecuador
Flora of Peru
Taxa named by Carl Sigismund Kunth